The 36th Annual Grammy Awards were held on March 1, 1994. They recognized accomplishments by musicians from the previous year. Whitney Houston was the Big Winner winning 3 awards including Record of the Year and Album of the Year while opening the show with "I Will Always Love You".

Audrey Hepburn's win made her the fifth person to become an EGOT, and the first person to complete the status posthumously.

Paul Simon was the first performer of the evening.

Performers
 Whitney Houston – I Will Always Love You
 Kenny G & Toni Braxton – Breathe Again
 Gloria Estefan – Mi Tierra
 Garth Brooks – Standing Outside the Fire
 Sting – If I Ever Lose My Faith In You
 Aerosmith – Livin' On The Edge
 Billy Joel – The River Of Dreams
 Aretha Franklin – (You Make Me Feel Like) A Natural Woman
 Natalie Cole – It's Sand Man
 Bonnie Raitt, Don Was, Bruce Springsteen, Steve Winwood, Tony! Toni! Toné!, Narada Michael Walden, B.B. King - Tribute to Curtis Mayfield

Presenters
 Bono – Grammy Legend Award to Frank Sinatra
 Danny Glover - Lifetime Achievement Award to Aretha Franklin
 SWV & Salt-N-Pepa – Best Rap Performance by a Duo or Group
 Dolly Parton & David Foster – Best Female Pop Vocal Performance
 Kenny G & Toni Braxton – Best Male Pop Vocal Performance
 Shawn Colvin, Trisha Yearwood & Mary Chapin Carpenter – Best Male Country Vocal Performance
 Meat Loaf & Vanessa Williams – Best Rock Performance by a Duo or Group with Vocals
 k.d. lang & Tony Bennett – Best Alternative Music Album
 Tevin Campbell, Jon Secada & Celine Dion – Best Tropical Latin Album
 Lee Ritenour & Oleta Adams - Best Jazz Vocal Performance
 Billy Joel – Producer of the Year
 Alan Jackson, Don Was & Jody Watley - Best New Artist
 Spin Doctors & Melissa Etheridge – Song of the Year
 B.B. King & Steve Winwood – Record of the Year
 Bonnie Raitt & Lena Horne – Album of the Year

Award winners
Record of the Year
"I Will Always Love You" – Whitney Houston
David Foster, producer; Tom Elmhirst & Mark Rankin, engineers/mixers
Walter Afanasieff (producer) for "A Whole New World" - Peabo Bryson & Regina Belle
Joe Nicolo & Danny Kortchmar (producer) for "The River of Dreams" - Billy Joel 
Sting & Hugh Padgham (producer) for "If I Ever Lose My Faith in You" - Sting
Neil Young (producer) for "Harvest Moon" - Neil Young
Album of the Year
 The Bodyguard: Original Soundtrack Album – Whitney Houston Houston, Babyface, BeBe Winans, David Cole, David Foster, L.A. Reid, Narada Michael Walden, Robert Clivilles, Clive Davis, producerR.E.M & Scott Litt (producers) for Automatic for the People
Walter Becker (producer) & Donald Fagen (artist) for Kamakiriad
Billy Joel & Danny Kortchmar, Joe Nicolo (producers) for River of Dreams
Sting and Hugh Padgham (producers) for Ten Summoner's Tales

Song of the YearAlan Menken & Tim Rice (songwriters) for "A Whole New World" performed by Peabo Bryson & Regina BelleBilly Joel for "The River of Dreams" performed by Billy Joel
Jim Steinman for "I'd Do Anything for Love (But I Won't Do That)" performed by Meat Loaf
Sting for "If I Ever Lose My Faith in You" performed by Sting
Neil Young for "Harvest Moon" performed by Neil Young
Best New ArtistToni BraxtonBelly
Blind Melon
Digable Planets
SWV

Pop
Best Pop Vocal Performance, FemaleWhitney Houston for "I Will Always Love You"Mariah Carey — "Dreamlover"
Shawn Colvin — "I Don't Know Why"
k.d. lang — "Miss Chatelaine"
Tina Turner — "I Don't Wanna Fight"
Best Pop Vocal Performance, MaleSting for "If I Ever Lose My Faith in You""The Crying Game" – Boy George
"The River of Dreams" – Billy Joel
"Don't Take Away My Heaven" – Aaron Neville
"Have I Told You Lately" – Rod Stewart
Best Pop Performance by a Duo or Group with VocalPeabo Bryson & Regina Belle for "A Whole New World""When I Fall in Love" — Celine Dion & Clive Griffin
"Man on the Moon" — R.E.M.
"The Music of the Night" — Barbra Streisand & Michael Crawford
"Love Is" — Vanessa Williams & Brian McKnight
Best Pop Instrumental PerformanceBranford Marsalis & Bruce Hornsby for "Barcelona Mona"Alternative
Best Alternative Music PerformanceU2 for Zooropa
 Belly – Star Nirvana – In Utero R.E.M. – Automatic for the People The Smashing Pumpkins – Siamese DreamBlues
Best Traditional Blues Album
B.B. King for Blues SummitBest Contemporary Blues Album
Buddy Guy for Feels Like RainChildren's
Best Musical Album for Children
Alan Menken, Tim Rice (producers) & various artists for Aladdin - Original Motion Picture SoundtrackBest Spoken Word Album for Children
Deborah Raffin, Michael Viner (producers) & Audrey Hepburn for Audrey Hepburn's Enchanted TalesComedy
From 1994 through 2003, see "Best Spoken Comedy Album" under the "Spoken" field, below.

Classical
Best Orchestral Performance
Pierre Boulez (conductor)& the Chicago Symphony Orchestra for Bartók: The Wooden PrinceBest Classical Vocal Performance
Arleen Auger for The Art of Arleen Auger (Works of Larsen, Purcell, Schumann, Mozart)       
Best Opera Recording
Steven Paul (producer), John Nelson (conductor), John Aler, Kathleen Battle, Michael Chance, Mark S. Doss, Marilyn Horne, Neil Mackie, Sylvia McNair,  Samuel Ramey, the Ambrosian Opera Chorus & the English Chamber Orchestra for Handel: SemeleBest Performance of a Choral Work
Pierre Boulez (conductor), Margaret Hillis (choir director) & the Chicago Symphony Orchestra & Chorus for Bartók: Cantata ProfanaBest Classical Performance-Instrumental Soloist(s) (with orchestra)
James Levine (conductor), Anne-Sophie Mutter & the Chicago Symphony Orchestra for Berg: Violin Concerto/Rihm: Time Chant      
Best Classical Performance-Instrumental Soloist (without orchestra)
John Browning for Barber: The Complete Solo Piano Music      
Best Chamber Music Performance
The Emerson String Quartet for Ives: String Quartets Nos. 1, 2/ Barber: String Quartet Op.11 (American Originals)Best Contemporary Composition
Elliott Carter (composer), Oliver Knussen (conductor) & the London Symphony Orchestra for Violin Concerto
Best Classical Album
Karl-August Naegler (producer), Pierre Boulez (conductor), John Aler, John Tomlinson & the Chicago Symphony Orchestra & Chorus for Bartók: The Wooden Prince & Cantata Profana Composing and arranging
Best Instrumental Composition
Kenny G (composer) for "Forever in Love"
Best Song Written Specifically for a Motion Picture or for Television
Alan Menken & Tim Rice (songwriters) for "A Whole New World (Aladdin's Theme)" performed by Regina Belle & Peabo Bryson 
Best Instrumental Composition Written for a Motion Picture or for Television
Alan Menken (composer) for Aladdin performed by various artists   
Best Arrangement on an Instrumental
Dave Grusin (arranger) for "Mood Indigo"
Best Instrumental Arrangement Accompanying Vocal(s)
David Foster & Jeremy Lubbock (arrangers) for "When I Fall in Love" performed by Céline Dion & Clive Griffin

Country
Best Country Vocal Performance, Female
Mary Chapin Carpenter for "Passionate Kisses"
Best Country Vocal Performance, Male
Dwight Yoakam for "Ain't That Lonely Yet"
Best Country Performance by a Duo or Group with Vocal
Brooks & Dunn for "Hard Workin' Man"
Best Country Vocal Collaboration
Linda Davis & Reba McEntire for "Does He Love You"
Best Country Instrumental Performance
Asleep at the Wheel, Chet Atkins, Eldon Shamblin, Johnny Gimble, Marty Stuart, Reuben "Lucky Oceans" Gosfield & Vince Gill for "Red Wing"
Best Country Song
Lucinda Williams (songwriter) for "Passionate Kisses" performed by Mary Chapin Carpenter
Best Bluegrass Album
The Nashville Bluegrass Band for Waitin' for the Hard Times to Go

Folk
Best Traditional Folk Album
The Chieftains for The Celtic Harp: A Tribute To Edward BuntingBest Contemporary Folk Album
Nanci Griffith for Other Voices/Other RoomsGospel
Best Pop/Contemporary Gospel Album
Steven Curtis Chapman for The Live AdventureBest Rock Gospel Album
dc Talk for Free at Last  
Best Traditional Soul Gospel Album
Shirley Caesar for Stand Still  
Best Contemporary Soul Gospel Album
The Winans for All OutBest Southern Gospel, Country Gospel or Bluegrass Gospel Album
Kathy Mattea for Good News  
Best Gospel Album by a Choir or Chorus
Carol Cymbala (choir director) for Live...We Come Rejoicing performed by the Brooklyn Tabernacle Choir

Historical
Best Historical Album
Michael Lang & Phil Schaap (producers) for The Complete Billie Holiday on Verve 1945-1959Jazz
Best Jazz Instrumental Solo
Joe Henderson for "Miles Ahead"
Best Jazz Instrumental Performance, Individual or Group
Joe Henderson for So Near, So Far (Musings for Miles)  
Best Large Jazz Ensemble Performance
Miles Davis & Quincy Jones for Miles & Quincy Live at Montreux      
Best Jazz Vocal Performance
Natalie Cole for Take a LookBest Contemporary Jazz Performance (Instrumental)
Pat Metheny Group for The Road to YouLatin
Best Latin Pop Album
Luis Miguel for AriesBest Tropical Latin Album
Gloria Estefan for Mi Tierra  
Best Mexican-American Album
Selena for Live!Musical show
Best Musical Show Album
George Martin (producer), Pete Townshend (composer & lyricist) & the original cast for The Who's TommyMusic video
Best Music Video, Short Form
Prudence Fenton (video producer), Stephen Johnson (video director) & Peter Gabriel for "Steam"
Best Music Video, Long Form
Julie Fong (video producer), Doug Nichol (video director) & Sting for Ten Summoner's TalesNew Age
Best New Age Album
Paul Winter Consort for Spanish AngelPackaging and notes
Best Recording Package
David Lau (art director) for The Complete Billie Holiday on Verve 1945-1959 performed by Billie Holiday  
Best Album Notes
Buck Clayton, Joel E. Siegel & Phil Schaap (notes writers) for The Complete Billie Holiday on Verve 1945-1959 performed by Billie Holiday

Polka
Best Polka Album
Walter Ostanek for Accordionally Yours performed by Walter Ostanek & His Band

Production and engineering
Best Engineered Album, Non-Classical
Hugh Padgham (engineer) for Ten Summoner's Tales performed by Sting

Best Engineered Album, Classical
Rainer Maillard (engineer), Pierre Boulez (conductor) & the Chicago Symphony Orchestra & Chorus for Bartók: The Wooden Prince & Cantata Profana Producer of the Year
David Foster

Classical Producer of the Year
Judith Sherman

R&B
Best R&B Vocal Performance, Female
Toni Braxton for "Another Sad Love Song"
Aretha Franklin – "Someday We'll All Be Free"
Whitney Houston – "I'm Every Woman"
Janet Jackson – "That's The Way Love Goes"
Patti LaBelle – "All Right Now"
Best R&B Vocal Performance, Male
Ray Charles for "A Song for You"
"Can We Talk" – Tevin Campbell
"For the Cool in You" – Babyface
"How Deep Is Your Love" – Luther Vandross
 "Voodoo" – Teddy Pendergrass
Best R&B Performance by a Duo or Group with Vocal
Sade for "No Ordinary Love"
Boyz II Men "Let It Snow"
Earth, Wind & Fire "Sunday Morning"
En Vogue "Give It Up, Turn It Loose"
Tony! Toni! Toné! "Anniversary"
Best Rhythm & Blues Song
Janet Jackson, Jimmy Jam and Terry Lewis (songwriters) for "That's the Way Love Goes" performed by Janet Jackson
Babyface & Daryl Simmons (songwriters) for "Can We Talk" (Tevin Campbell)
Luther Vandross & Marcus Miller (songwriters) for "Little Miracles (Happen Every Day)" (Luther Vandross)
Luther Vandross & Reed Vertelney (songwriters) for "Heaven Knows" (Luther Vandross)
Raphael Wiggins & Carl Wheeler (songwriters) for "Anniversary" (Tony! Toni! Toné!)

Rap
Best Rap Solo Performance
Dr. Dre for "Let Me Ride"
Paperboy – "Ditty"
Sir Mix-a-Lot – "Just Da Pimpin' In Me"
MC Lyte – "Ruffneck"
LL Cool J – "Stand by Your Man"
Best Rap Performance by a Duo or Group
Digable Planets for "Rebirth of Slick (Cool Like Dat)"
Arrested Development — "Revolution"
Cypress Hill — "Insane in the Brain"
Dr. Dre & Snoop Dogg — "Nuthin' but a 'G' Thang"
Naughty by Nature — "Hip Hop Hooray"

Reggae
Best Reggae Album
Inner Circle for Bad BoysRock
Best Rock Vocal Performance, Solo
Meat Loaf for "I'd Do Anything for Love (But I Won't Do That)"
Bob Dylan – "All Along the Watchtower"
Peter Gabriel – "Steam"
Lenny Kravitz – "Are You Gonna Go My Way"
Sting – "Demolition Man"
Best Rock Performance by a Duo or Group with Vocal
Aerosmith for "Livin' on the Edge"
Blind Melon – "No Rain"
Bob Dylan, Roger McGuinn, Tom Petty, Neil Young, Eric Clapton and George Harrison– "My Back Pages"
Soul Asylum – "Runaway Train"
Spin Doctors – "Two Princes"
Best Rock Instrumental Performance
Steve Vai for "Sofa"
Aerosmith – "Boogie Man"
Jeff Beck and Jed Leiber – "Hi-Heel Sneakers"
Joe Satriani – "Speed of Light"
Tangerine Dream – "Purple Haze
Best Hard Rock Performance with Vocal
Stone Temple Pilots for "Plush"
AC/DC – "Highway to Hell" (live)
Living Colour – "Leave It Alone"
Robert Plant – "Calling to You"
The Smashing Pumpkins – "Cherub Rock"
Best Metal Performance with Vocal
Ozzy Osbourne for "I Don't Want to Change the World"
Iron Maiden – "Fear of the Dark" (live)
Megadeth – "Angry Again"
Suicidal Tendencies – "Institutionalized"
White Zombie – "Thunder Kiss '65"
Best Rock Song
David Pirner (songwriter) for "Runaway Train" performed by Soul Asylum

Spoken
Best Spoken Word or Non-musical Album
Maya Angelou for On the Pulse of Morning  
Best Spoken Comedy Album
George Carlin for Jammin' in New YorkTraditional pop
Best Traditional Pop Vocal Performance
Tony Bennett for Steppin' Out

World
Best World Music Album
V. M. Bhatt & Ry Cooder for A Meeting by the River''

Special merit awards

Grammy Legend Award
Curtis Mayfield
Frank Sinatra

MusiCares Person of the Year
Gloria Estefan

References

External links
Grammy Award Winners

 036
1994 in New York City
1994 music awards
Radio City Music Hall
1994 in American music
March 1994 events in the United States
Grammy